Jackson Demonstration State Forest is a public forest in Mendocino County, California managed by the California Department of Forestry and Fire Protection. It is the largest demonstration forest operated by the State of California. The forest land, located along California State Highway 20 between Willits and the coastal city of Fort Bragg, was formerly owned by Caspar Lumber Company. The forest holds sacred value as an ancestral home and ceremonial site for the Coyote Valley Band of Pomo Indians. 

The  that make up the forest were purchased in 1947 and the demonstration forest was created in 1949. Coast redwood is the most common type of tree in the forest, but there is also Douglas fir, grand fir, hemlock, bishop pine, tanoak, alder, madrone and bay myrtle.

Logging of the area began in 1862, and intense industrial logging has taken place for many decades. There have been several generations of harvests and replantings. The Caspar 500 timber harvest plan sparked opposition around 2020 as it included some very large redwood trees in a  near the coastal community of Caspar. The area, heavily used for hiking and mountain biking, is closer to residential areas and public access roads than more remote areas that have been logged in the past.

References

External links

Jackson Demonstration State Forest, California Department of Forestry and Fire Protection
Campaign to Restore Jackson State Redwood Forest

California state forests
Protected areas of Mendocino County, California
1949 establishments in California
Protected areas established in 1949